Artemisia bhutanica is a species of mugwort endemic to the Bhutan Himalayas.

Habitat
Grows in open disturbed areas between 2750 and 3850 m.

References

bhutanica
Endemic flora of Bhutan